{{Infobox beauty pageant
| photo = File:Kristen Dalton (Miss USA).jpg
| caption = Miss USA 2009 Kristen Dalton
| winner = Kristen Dalton North Carolina
| placements = 15
| entrants = 51
| date = April 19, 2009
| presenters = 
| acts = 
| congeniality = Cynthia Pate Wyoming
| photogenic = Jessi Pierson West Virginia
| venue= The AXIS, Las Vegas, Nevada
| broadcaster= 
| before = 2008
| next = 2010
}}Miss USA 2009 was the 58th Miss USA pageant, held at the Theatre for the Performing Arts in Planet Hollywood Resort and Casino in Las Vegas, Nevada on April 19, 2009. At the conclusion of the final night of competition, Kristen Dalton of North Carolina was crowned by outgoing titleholder Crystle Stewart of Texas.

The event was hosted by Billy Bush of Access Hollywood and actress Nadine Velazquez; Bush returned to host the pageant which he last emceed in 2005.  He had previously co-hosted Miss USA 2003 with Daisy Fuentes and Miss USA 2004–2005 with Nancy O'Dell. Entertainment was provided by Kevin Rudolf who performed "Let It Rock" during the swimsuit competition and The Veronicas performed "Untouched" during the evening gown competition.

The competition was broadcast in High Definition for only the second time in history.

Delegates representing the fifty states plus the District of Columbia competed in the pageant, and arrived in Las Vegas on April 2. Miss USA Kristen Dalton represented the USA at the Miss Universe 2009 pageant, where she reached the Top 10.

Pageants were held from June 2008 to January 2009 to select the representative for each state. During the final show on April 19, the fifteen delegates with the highest average scores from the preliminary competition were announced. The top fifteen competed in the swimsuit competition. The top ten delegates from swimsuit competed in evening gown. The top five delegates from the evening gown competition (not averaged composite scores from both competitions) competed in the final question round to determine the winner. The judges' composite score was shown after each round of competition for only the third time since 2002.

Results
Placements

Special awards

Final scores

 Winner
 First Runner-up
 Second Runner-up
 Third Runner-up
 Fourth Runner-up
 Top 10 Finalist
 Top 15 Semifinalist
(#) Rank in each round of competition

Order of announcements

Top 15

Top 10

Top 5

Delegates
The Miss USA 2009 delegates were:

Historical significance
 North Carolina wins competition for the second time.
 California earns the 1st runner-up position for the seventh time. The last time it placed this was in 2006.
 Arizona earns the 2nd runner-up position for the third time. The last time it placed this was in 1987.
 Utah earns the 3rd runner-up position for the second time and reaches its highest placement since 1982. The last time it placed this was in 1964.
 Kentucky earns the 4th runner-up position for the fifth time and reached its highest placement since Tara Conner won in 2006. The last time it placed this was in 1982.
 States that placed in the semifinals from previous year were California, Minnesota, South Carolina, Tennessee, Texas, and Utah.
 Texas placed for the eighth consecutive year.
 California placed for the fifth consecutive year.
 South Carolina and Tennessee placed for the fourth consecutive year.
 Utah placed for the third consecutive year.
 Minnesota placed for the second consecutive year.
 North Carolina and Virginia last placed in 2007.
 Arizona, Georgia and Kentucky last placed in 2006.
 Arkansas and West Virginia last placed in 2005.
 Idaho last placed in 2004.
 Connecticut last placed in 2002.
 Rhode Island breaks an ongoing streak of placements since 2006.
 Missouri breaks an ongoing streak of placements since 2007.

Judges

Preliminary judges
Cara Petry
Chip Lightman
Lori Levine
Nick Light
Randall Winston
Rich Thurber
Seth Mayeri

Telecast judges
Alicia Jacobs - Access Hollywood & KVBC News Entertainment
Brian Graden - MTV Networks Music Channel
Claudia Jordan - Deal or No Deal The Celebrity Apprentice, Miss Rhode Island USA 1997, Miss Rhode Island Teen USA 1990, host of Miss Universe 2009
Eric Trump - Trump Organization
Holly Madison - Playboy model, Television personality
John Miller - NBC Universal executive
Kelly Monaco - Dancing with the Stars season 1 winner
Kenan Thompson - Saturday Night Live
Perez Hilton - Celebrity gossip
Robert Earl - CEO of Planet Hollywood Resort and Casino
Shandi Finnessey - Miss USA 2004 from Missouri
Willie Geist - Morning Joe of MSNBC

Background musicContestants introduction: "Hot N Cold" by Katy Perry; "That's Not My Name" by The Ting TingsSwimsuit competition: "Let It Rock" by Kevin RudolfEvening gown competition:''' "Untouched" by The Veronicas

Controversy

During the 2009 Miss USA pageant, Miss California Carrie Prejean, was asked by openly gay pageant judge, Perez Hilton, whether she believed every state should legalize same-sex marriage. She responded that she did not.  After the pageant Hilton made negative comments about the contestant and told ABC News: "She lost it because of that question. She was definitely the front-runner before that," leading some to believe that the answer directly had caused her to lose the competition.  Prejean stated that Miss California USA officials had pressured her to apologize for her statement and "not talk" about her Christian faith.

Several politicians and commentators assailed Hilton and defended Prejean for honestly stating her personal beliefs.

Following the pageant, Prejean hired a Christian public relations firm, and appeared in a television advertisement by the National Organization for Marriage. However, on June 10, 2009, Prejean again stated that her question caused her to lose her title when she learned she was fired by Donald Trump. Miss California USA officials state that her answer had nothing to do with her termination, citing continued breach of her contract instead.

New crown
In keeping with co-owner NBC Universal's "Green is Universal" environmental initiative, the Miss Universe Organization announced that Diamond Nexus Labs would become the official jewelry sponsor for the Miss Universe, Miss USA and Miss Teen USA pageants. DNL 's 
man-made gemstones are "all synthesized in clean labs using environmentally friendly processes".  Diamond Nexus Labs will create a custom-designed crown for Miss USA 2009, as well as for the Miss Universe and Miss Teen USA pageants later this year.

Notes

References

External links 
 

2009
April 2009 events in the United States
2009 beauty pageants
2009 in Nevada
21st century in Las Vegas
Zappos Theater